Dilip Kumar Ganguly (born 1940) is an Indian neurophysiologist, neuropharmacologist, and a former head of the Department of Pharmacology and Experimental Therapeutics and director  of the Indian Institute of Chemical Biology. Born on 4 January 1940 in Kolkata, in the Indian state of West Bengal, he is known for his researches on Parkinsonism as well as for his efforts in promoting neuropharmacological studies in India, and his researches have been documented by way of several articles in per-reviewed journals. Besides, he has contributed chapters to books published by others and his work has been cited by any researchers. He is a founder fellow of the Indian Academy of Neurosciences and has served as its vice president. The Council of Scientific and Industrial Research, the apex agency of the Government of India for scientific research, awarded him the Shanti Swarup Bhatnagar Prize for Science and Technology, one of the highest Indian science awards for his contributions to Medical Sciences in 1985.

Selected bibliography

Notes

References

External links

Further reading 
 

Recipients of the Shanti Swarup Bhatnagar Award in Medical Science
Indian medical writers
1940 births
Medical doctors from Kolkata
Living people
Indian neurologists
Indian pharmacologists
20th-century Indian medical doctors